This is a list of student newspapers at colleges and universities in the United States.

Alabama
 Alabama State University – The Hornet Tribune
 Auburn University – The Auburn Plainsman
 Jacksonville State University – The Chanticleer
 Troy University – Tropolitan
 University of Alabama at Birmingham – The Kaleidoscope
 University of Alabama in Huntsville – The Charger Times
 University of Alabama, Tuscaloosa – The Crimson White
 University of Montevallo – The Alabamian
 University of North Alabama – Florala
 University of South Alabama – Vanguard
 University of West Alabama – muse

Alaska
 University of Alaska Anchorage – The Northern Light
 University of Alaska Fairbanks – The Sun Star
 University of Alaska Southeast – The Whalesong

Arizona
 Arizona State University – State Press
 Arizona State University at the West campus – @west news
 Embry–Riddle Aeronautical University – Horizons
 Mesa Community College – Mesa Legend
 Northern Arizona University – The Lumberjack
 Pima Community College – The Aztec Press
 Prescott College – The Raven Review
 University of Arizona – Arizona Daily Wildcat

Arkansas
 Arkansas State University – The Herald
 Arkansas Tech University – Arka Tech
 University of Arkansas – The Arkansas Traveler
 University of Central Arkansas – The Echo

California
 Azusa Pacific University – The Clause
 Bakersfield College – The Renegade Rip
 Biola University – The Chimes
 Cabrillo College – The Voice
 California Baptist University – The Banner
 California Polytechnic State University, San Luis Obispo – Mustang News
 California Institute of Technology - The California Tech
 California State Polytechnic University, Pomona – The Poly Post, The Pomona Point
 California State University, Chico – The Orion
 California State University, East Bay – The Pioneer
California State University, Dominguez Hills – The Bulletin
 California State University, Fresno – The Daily Collegian
 California State University, Fullerton – The Daily Titan
 California State University, Long Beach – 22 West Magazine, Daily Forty-Niner and DIG magazine
 California State University, Los Angeles – University Times
 California State University, Monterey Bay – The Lutrinae
 California State University, Northridge – The Daily Sundial
 California State University, Sacramento – The State Hornet
 California State University, San Bernardino – Coyote Chronicle
 California State University, San Marcos – Cougar Chronicle
 Cerritos College – Talon Marks
 Chapman University – The Panther
 City College of San Francisco – Guardsman
 Claremont Colleges  – The Student Life
 Claremont McKenna College – The Forum
 College of the Desert – The Chaparral
 College of Marin – Echo Times
 Concordia University, Irvine – Hilltop Herald
 Contra Costa College – The Advocate
 Cuesta College - The Cuestonian
 The Culinary Institute of America (Greystone campus) – Sage Thymes
 De Anza College – La Voz
 Diablo Valley College – The Inquirer
 Foothill College – The Sentinel
 Glendale College – El Vaquero
 Humboldt State University – The Lumberjack
 Laney College – Laney Tower
 Life Chiropractic College West – Lifelines
 Long Beach City College – The Viking Online
 Los Angeles Valley College – The Valley Star
 Los Medanos College – Experience
 Loyola Marymount University – The Los Angeles Loyolan
 Mills College – The Campanil
 Occidental College – The Occidental
 Ohlone College — "The Ohlone Monitor″
 Pasadena City College – Courier
 San Diego State University – The Daily Aztec
 San Francisco State University – The Golden Gate [X]press
 San José State University – The Spartan Daily
 Santa Clara University – The Santa Clara
 Santa Monica College – The Corsair
 Scripps College – The Scripps Voice
 Sonoma State University – The Sonoma State STAR
 Stanford University – The Stanford Daily, The Stanford Review
 University of California, Berkeley – The Daily Californian,The Free Peach
 University of California, Davis – The California Aggie
 University of California, Irvine – New University
 University of California, Los Angeles – Daily Bruin
 University of California, Merced – The Prodigy
 University of California, Riverside – The Highlander
University of California, San Diego – The UCSD Guardian
University of California, Santa Barbara – Daily Nexus, The Bottom Line
 University of California, Santa Cruz – City on a Hill Press
 University of San Diego – The USD Vista, California Review
 University of San Diego School of Law – Motions
 University of San Francisco – San Francisco Foghorn
 University of Southern California – Daily Trojan
 Whittier College – The Quaker Campus

Colorado
 Adams State College – The South Coloradan
 Fort Lewis College – The Independent
 Front Range Community College – The Front Page
 Colorado College – The Catalyst
 Colorado School of Mines – The Oredigger
 Colorado State University – Rocky Mountain Collegian
 Colorado State University-Pueblo – Today
 Mesa State College – Criterion
 University of Colorado at Boulder – CU Independent
 University of Colorado at Denver – The Advocate
 University of Denver – Clarion
 University of Northern Colorado – The Mirror (UNC newspaper)

Connecticut
 Central Connecticut State University – The Recorder
 Eastern Connecticut State University – The Campus Lantern
 Fairfield University – The Fairfield Mirror
 Quinnipiac University – The Quinnipiac Chronicle
 Trinity College – The Trinity Tripod
 University of Connecticut – The Daily Campus
 University of Hartford – The Informer
 University of New Haven – The Charger Bulletin
 Wesleyan University – The Wesleyan Argus
 Yale University – The Yale Daily News (daily), The Yale Herald (weekly)

Delaware
 Delaware Tech,  Jack F. Owens Campus – The Script
 University of Delaware – The Review

District of Columbia
 American University – The Eagle
 The Catholic University of America – The Tower
 Gallaudet University – The Buff and Blue
 George Washington University – The GW Hatchet
 Georgetown University – The Hoya, Georgetown Law Weekly
 Howard University – The Hilltop

Florida
 Barry University – The Buccaneer
 Eckerd College – The Current
 Embry–Riddle Aeronautical University – The Avion
 Florida A&M University – The Famuan
 Florida Atlantic University – University Press
 Florida Gulf Coast University – Eagle News
 Florida Institute of Technology – The Crimson'''
 Florida International University – PantherNOW
 Florida State University – FSView & Florida FlambeauFlorida SouthWestern State College – The FSW Compass Jacksonville University – The Navigator Miami Dade College – The Reporter 
 New College of Florida – The Catalyst Nova Southeastern University – The Current Palm Beach Atlantic University – The Beacon Pensacola State College – The Corsair Rollins College – The Sandspur Stetson University – The Reporter Tallahassee Community College – The Talon University of Central Florida – KnightNews.com, Central Florida Future University of Florida – The Independent Florida Alligator,  The Fine Print University of Miami – The Miami Hurricane University of Miami School of Law – Res Ipsa Loquitur University of North Florida – The Spinnaker University of South Florida – The Oracle University of Tampa – The Minaret University of West Florida – The Voyager Valencia Community College – The Valencia VoiceGeorgia
 Berry College – Campus Carrier Clark Atlanta University – The Panther Covenant College – The Bagpipe Emory University – The Emory Wheel Georgia College & State University – The Colonnade Georgia Institute of Technology (Georgia Tech) – The Technique Georgia Southern University – The George-Anne Georgia Southwestern State University - The Sou'Wester Georgia State University – The Signal Kennesaw State University – The Sentinel Mercer University – The Mercer Cluster Morehouse College – The Maroon Tiger Piedmont University – The Roar Savannah State University – The Tiger's Roar Spelman College – The Blue Print University of Georgia – The Red & Black University of West Georgia – The West Georgian Valdosta State University – The Spectator Young Harris College – Enotah EchoesHawaii
 Hawaii Pacific University – Kalamalama Honolulu Community College, University of Hawaii –  Ka La Kapiolani Community College, University of Hawaii –  Kapio Kauai Community College, University of Hawaii –  Ka Leo O KCC Leeward Community College, University of Hawaii –  Ka Manao University of Hawaii at Hilo – Ke Kalahea University of Hawaii at Manoa – Ka Leo O Hawaii Windward Community College, University of Hawaii –  Ka OhanaIdaho
 Albertson College of Idaho – The Coyote Boise State University – The Arbiter Brigham Young University–Idaho – The Scroll Idaho State University – The Bengal Lewis–Clark State College – The Pathfinder North Idaho College – The Sentinel University of Idaho – The ArgonautIllinois
 Augustana College – Augustana Observer Bradley University – The Scout Columbia College – Columbia Chronicle DePaul University – The DePaulia Eastern Illinois University – The Daily Eastern News Elmhurst University – The Leader Eureka College – Pegasus Illinois Central College – ICC Harbinger Illinois Institute of Technology – TechNews Illinois State University – The Vidette Knox College – The Knox Student Lake Land College – The Navigator News Lewis University – The Lewis Flyer Loyola University Chicago – Phoenix Moraine Valley Community College – The Glacier National Louis University – The National Northeastern Illinois University – Independent Northern Illinois University – Northern Star Northwestern University – The Daily Northwestern Southern Illinois University Carbondale – The Daily Egyptian University of Chicago – The Chicago Maroon, Chicago Weekly University of Illinois at Chicago – The Chicago Flame,  The Argus,  The Asterisk (satire)
 University of Illinois at Urbana–Champaign – Daily Illini Western Illinois University – Western Courier Wheaton College – The Wheaton RecordIndiana
 Anderson University – Anderson University News and Events Ball State University – The Ball State Daily News Butler University – The Butler Collegian Earlham College – Earlham College Word Franklin College – The Franklin Goshen College – Goshen College Record Indiana State University – Indiana Statesman Indiana University Bloomington – Indiana Daily Student Indiana University Purdue University at Fort Wayne – The Communicator Indiana University Purdue University at Indianapolis – The Sagamore Indiana University South Bend – The Preface Indiana University Southeast – The Horizon Purdue University – Purdue Exponent Purdue University Calumet – The Chronicle Rose-Hulman Institute of Technology – The Rose Thorn Taylor University – The Echo University of Indianapolis – The Reflector University of Notre Dame – The Observer and The Irish Rover University of Southern Indiana – The Shield Valparaiso University – The Torch Wabash College – The BachelorIowa
 Buena Vista University – The Tack Coe College – The Cosmos Cornell College – The Cornellian Des Moines Area Community College – Campus Chronicle Drake University – The Times-Delphic Grinnell College – The Scarlet and Black Iowa Central Community College - The Collegian Iowa State University – Iowa State Daily North Iowa Area Community College – Logos Simpson College – Simpsonian University of Iowa – The Daily Iowan University of Northern Iowa – The Northern IowanKansas
 Baker University -- The Baker Orange Emporia State University – The Bulletin Fort Hays State University – The Leader and The Edge
 Kansas City Kansas Community College – Advocate
 Kansas State – The Collegian
 Pittsburg State University – Collegio
 University of Kansas – University Daily Kansan
 Washburn University – The Washburn Review
 Wichita State University – The Sunflower

Kentucky
 Bellarmine University – The Concord
 Berea College – The Pinnacle
 Eastern Kentucky University – The Eastern Progress
 Henderson Community College – The Hill
 Jefferson Community and Technical College – The Quadrangle
 Morehead State University – The Trail Blazer
 Murray State University – The Murray State News
 Northern Kentucky University – The Northerner
 Transylvania University – The Rambler
 University of the Cumberlands – The Patriot Newspaper
 University of Kentucky – Kentucky Kernel
 University of Louisville – The Louisville Cardinal
 Western Kentucky University – College Heights Herald

Louisiana
 Baton Rouge Community College – BRCC Today
 Louisiana State University – The Daily Reveille
 Louisiana Tech University – The Tech Talk
 Loyola University New Orleans – The Maroon
 McNeese State University – The Contraband
 Northwestern State University – The Current Sauce
 Southeastern Louisiana University – The Lion's Roar
 Southern University – The Southern Digest
 Grambling State University - The Gramblinite
 Tulane University – The Hullabaloo
 University of Louisiana at Lafayette – The Vermilion
 University of Louisiana at Monroe – The Hawkeye
 University of New Orleans – Driftwood

Maine
 Bates College – The Bates Student
 Bowdoin College – The Bowdoin Orient
 Colby College – The Colby Echo
 Southern Maine Community College – The Beacon
 University of Southern Maine - The Free Press
 University of Maine – The Maine Campus

Maryland
 Anne Arundel Community College – Campus Current
Frostburg State University – The Bottom Line
 Johns Hopkins University – The Johns Hopkins News-Letter
 Loyola University Maryland – The Greyhound
 McDaniel College – The Free Press
 Montgomery College – Advocate
 Morgan State University  – The Spokesman
 St. John's College – The Gadfly
 St. Mary's College of Maryland – The Point News
 Salisbury University – The Flyer
 Towson University – Towerlight
 University of Baltimore – The UB Post
 University of Maryland, Baltimore County – The Retriever Weekly
 University of Maryland, College Park – The Diamondback
 Washington College – The Elm

Massachusetts
 Amherst College – The Student
 Bay Path University - Network News
 Bentley University – The Vanguard
 Boston College –The Heights and The Torch
 Boston University – Daily Free Press
 Brandeis University – The Brandeis Hoot, The Justice, The Blowfish (satirical)
 Bridgewater State College – The Comment
 Emerson College – The Berkeley Beacon
 Fitchburg State University – The Point
 Framingham State University – The Gatepost
 Gordon College – The Tartan
 Harvard Law School – Harvard Law Record
 Harvard University – The Harvard Crimson
 MIT – The Tech
 Mount Holyoke College – Mount Holyoke News
 Northeastern University – The Huntington News
 Quincy College – The QC Voice
 Simmons College – The Simmons Voice
 Smith College – The Sophian
 Suffolk University – The Suffolk Journal
 Tufts University – Tufts Daily
 University of Massachusetts Amherst – Massachusetts Daily Collegian
 University of Massachusetts Boston – Mass Media
 University of Massachusetts Lowell – The Connector
 Wellesley College — The Wellesley News
 Wheaton College – Wheaton Wire
 Williams College – The Williams Record
 Worcester Polytechnic Institute – The Towers

Michigan
 Albion College – The Pleiad
 Calvin College – Chimes
 Central Michigan University – Central Michigan Life, Grand Central Magazine
 Cornerstone University – The Herald
 Delta College – Delta Collegiate
 Eastern Michigan University – The Eastern Echo
 Grand Rapids Community College – The GRCC Collegiate
 Grand Valley State University – Grand Valley Lanthorn
 Hillsdale College – The Collegian
 Hope College – The Anchor
 Lake Superior State University – The Compass
 Madonna University – Madonna Herald
 Marygrove College – Mustang Matters
 Michigan State University – The State News
 Michigan Technological University – The Lode
 Oakland Community College – Highland Voice
 Oakland University – The Oakland Post
 Olivet College – The Echo
 Saginaw Valley State University – The Saginaw Valley Journal and The Valley Vanguard
 Siena Heights University – Eclipse and Spectra
 Spring Arbor University – The Crusader and Blackbird Press
 St. Clair County Community College – The Erie Square Gazette
University of Detroit Mercy – The Varsity News
 University of Michigan – The Michigan Daily, The Michigan Review, The Michigan Every Three Weekly
 University of Michigan–Dearborn – The Michigan Journal
 University of Michigan–Flint – The Michigan Times
 Washtenaw Community College – 'The Washtenaw Voice
 Wayne State University – The South End and The Wayne Review
 Western Michigan University – Western Herald

Minnesota
 Augsburg University – The Echo
 Bemidji State University – Northern Student
 Bethel University – The Clarion
 Carleton College – The Carletonian
 College of Saint Benedict and Saint John's University – The Record
 Concordia College (Moorhead) – The Concordian
 Gustavus Adolphus College – The Gustavian Weekly
 Hamline University – The Oracle
 Luther Seminary – The Concord
 Macalester College – The Mac Weekly
 Minnesota State University, Mankato – The Reporter
 North Central University – The Northerner
 St. Catherine – The St. Catherine Wheel
 St. Cloud State University – University Chronicle
 St. Olaf College – Manitou Messenger
St. Thomas – The Aquin
Southwest Minnesota State University -- The Spur
 University of Minnesota, Duluth – Statesman
 University of Minnesota Morris – The University Register
 University of Minnesota, Twin Cities – Minnesota Daily
Winona State University – The Winonan

Mississippi
 Alcorn State University – Campus Chronicle
 Jackson State University – The Blue & White Flash
 Mississippi College – The Collegian
 Mississippi State University – The Reflector
 Mississippi Valley State University - The Delta Devils Gazette
 University of Mississippi – Daily Mississippian

Missouri
 Lindenwood University – The Legacy
 Missouri Southern State University – The Chart
 Missouri State University – The Standard
 Missouri Western State University – The Griffon News
 Northwest Missouri State University – Northwest Missourian
 Penn Valley Community College – Spectrum
 Rockhurst University – Rockhurst Sentinel
 St. Louis Community College–Florissant Valley – The Forum
 St. Louis Community College–Meramec – The Montage
 Saint Louis University – The University News
 Southeast Missouri State University – The Capaha Arrow
 Truman State University – Index
 University of Central Missouri – The Muleskinner
 University of Missouri – The Maneater
 University of Missouri–Kansas City – University News
 University of Missouri–St. Louis – The Current
 Washington University in St. Louis – Student Life
 Webster University – The Journal

Montana
 Montana State University – The Exponent
 University of Montana – Montana Kaimin

Nebraska
 Chadron State College – The Eagle
 Creighton University – Creightonian
 Hastings College — The Collegian
 Northeast Community College – The Viewpoint
 Nebraska Wesleyan University - The Yip
 University of Nebraska at Kearney – The Antelope
 University of Nebraska Omaha – The Gateway
 University of Nebraska–Lincoln – The Daily Nebraskan
 Wayne State College – The Wayne Stater

Nevada
 Nevada State College, Henderson – The Scorpion's Tale
 University of Nevada – Nevada Sagebrush
 University of Nevada, Las Vegas – Rebel Yell

New Hampshire
 Dartmouth College – The Dartmouth, The Dartmouth Review, The Dartmouth Independent, and the Dartmouth Free Press
 Keene State College – The Equinox
 Plymouth State University – The Clock
 Southern New Hampshire University – The Penmen Press
 University of New Hampshire – The New Hampshire

New Jersey
 Bergen Community College – The Torch
 The College of New Jersey – The Signal
 County College of Morris – The Youngtown Edition
 Drew University – The Nut
 Fairleigh Dickinson University – The Equinox
 Montclair State University – The Montclarion
 New Jersey City University – The Gothic Times
 New Jersey Institute of Technology – The Vector
 Princeton University – The Daily Princetonian
 Ramapo College of New Jersey -  The Ramapo News
 Rowan University - The Whit
 Rutgers University – The Daily Targum
 Saint Peter's College – The Pauw Wow
 Seton Hall University – The Setonian
 Seton Hall University School of Law – The Cross Examiner
 Stevens Institute of Technology – The Stute
 William Paterson University – The Beacon

New Mexico
 New Mexico State University – The Round Up'
 New Mexico Tech – Paydirt St. John's College – The Moon University of New Mexico – New Mexico Daily Lobo Western New Mexico University – The MustangNew York
 Adelphi University – Delphian Alfred University – Fiat Lux Baruch College – The Ticker Binghamton University – Pipe Dream,  The Free Press Canisius College – The Griffin Cayuga Community College – The Cayuga Collegian The City College of New York – The Campus Magazine and The Paper Clarkson University – Clarkson Integrator Colgate University – The Colgate Maroon-News The College of New Rochelle – Tatler The College of Saint Rose – The Chronicle College of Staten Island – The Banner Columbia University – Columbia Daily Spectator and The Fed The Cooper Union for the Advancement of Science and Art – The Cooper Pioneer Cornell Law School – The Cornell Law Tower Cornell University – The Cornell Daily Sun, The Cornell Review, and The Cornell Moderator The Culinary Institute of America (Hyde Park campus) – La Papillote Fordham University – The Fordham Ram (Rose Hill), The Observer (Lincoln Center), and The Paper (satirical)
 Hartwick College – Hilltops Hobart and William Smith Colleges - The Herald Hofstra University – The Hofstra Chronicle Hudson Valley Community College – The Hudsonian Iona College – The Ionian Ithaca College – The Ithacan Manhattan College – The Quadrangle Manhattanville College – Touchstone The New School — The New School Free Press New York University – Washington Square News Rensselaer Polytechnic Institute – The Rensselaer Polytechnic Rochester Institute of Technology – Reporter (full-color weekly college magazine)
 St. Bonaventure University – The Bona Venture St. Francis College – SFC Today St. John Fisher College – Cardinal Courier St. John's University – The Torch
 St. Lawrence University – The Hill News Skidmore College – Skidmore News State University of New York at Fredonia – The Leader State University of New York at Geneseo – The Lamron State University of New York at New Paltz – The New Paltz Oracle State University of New York at Oneonta – The State Times State University of New York at Potsdam – The Racquette SUNY Environmental Science and Forestry – The Knothole Stern College – Observer Stony Brook University – The Statesman Suffolk County Community College – The Compass (Ammerman Campus), The Western Student Press (Grant Campus)
 Syracuse University – The Daily Orange Union College – Concordiensis University at Albany – The Albany Student Press University at Buffalo – The Spectrum University of Rochester – Campus Times The Urban Assembly School for Emergency Management – The READY Report Utica College – The Tangerine Vassar College – The Miscellany News Wagner College – The Wagnerian Wells College – The Onyx Yeshiva University – Commentator Westchester Community College – The Viking News Multiple campuses – Community College Campus NewsNorth Carolina
 Appalachian State University – The Appalachian Barton College – The Collegiate Belmont Abbey College – The Crusader Bennett College – The Bennett Banner Brevard College – The Clarion Campbell University – The Campbell Times Catawba College – The Pioneer Chowan University – The Chowanian Davidson College – The Davidsonian Duke University – The Chronicle East Carolina University – The East Carolinian Elizabeth City State University – The Compass Elon University – The Pendulum Fayetteville State University – The Voice Gardner–Webb University – GWU Today Greensboro College – The Collegian Guilford College – The Guilfordian High Point University – Campus Chronicle Johnson C. Smith University – The Bull's Eye Lenoir–Rhyne University – The Rhynean Livingstone College – Livingstone Newsletter Meredith College – The Meredith Herald Methodist University – Small Talk Montreat College – Whetstone North Carolina Agricultural and Technical State University – The A&T Register North Carolina Central University – The Campus Echo North Carolina State University – The Technician North Carolina Wesleyan College – The Decree Pfeiffer University – The Falcon's Eye Queens University of Charlotte – The Queens Chronicle Salem College – The Salemite Shaw University – The Bear Facts St. Augustine's University – The Pen University of Mount Olive – UMO Today University of North Carolina at Asheville – Banner University of North Carolina at Chapel Hill – The Daily Tar Heel University of North Carolina at Charlotte – The Niner Times University of North Carolina at Greensboro – The Carolinian University of North Carolina at Pembroke – The Pine Needle University of North Carolina at Wilmington – The Seahawk University of North Carolina School of the Arts – N.C. Essay Wake Forest University – Old Gold & Black Warren Wilson College – The Echo Western Carolina University – Western Carolinian William Peace University – The Peace Times Wingate University – The Weekly Triangle Winston-Salem State University – The News ArgusNorth Dakota
 Minot State University – Red & Green North Dakota State University – The Spectrum University of Jamestown – The Collegian University of North Dakota – Dakota StudentOhio
 Ashland UniversityThe Collegian Bowling Green State UniversityBG News Capital UniversityThe Chimes Case Western Reserve UniversityThe Observer Cedarville UniversityCedars Cleveland State UniversityCleveland Stater, The Cauldron, The Gavel College of WoosterThe Wooster Voice Denison UniversityThe Denisonian John Carroll UniversityThe Carroll News Kent State UniversityDaily Kent Stater Kenyon CollegeKenyon Collegian, The Kenyon Observer Lorain County Community CollegeThe Collegian Marietta CollegeThe Marcolian Miami UniversityThe Miami Student Mount St. Joseph UniversityDateline Oberlin CollegeThe Oberlin Review, The Grape, Fearless and Loathing Ohio Dominican UniversityThe Tower Ohio Northern UniversityNorthern Review Ohio State UniversityThe Lantern, 1870, and The Sentinel Ohio UniversityThe Post Ohio Wesleyan UniversityThe Transcript Otterbein CollegeThe Tan & Cardinal Sinclair Community CollegeThe Clarion University of AkronThe Buchtelite University of CincinnatiNews Record University of DaytonFlyer News University of ToledoIndependent Collegian Wilberforce UniversityThe Mirror Wittenberg UniversityThe Wittenberg Torch Wright State UniversityThe Guardian Xavier UniversityXavier Newswire Youngstown State UniversityThe JambarOklahoma
 Cameron University – The Cameron Collegian Northwestern Oklahoma State University – Northwestern News Oklahoma Christian University – The Talon Oklahoma State University – The Daily O'Collegian Oral Roberts University – the Oracle University of Central Oklahoma – The Vista University of Oklahoma – The Oklahoma Daily University of Tulsa – The CollegianOregon
 Clackamas Community College – The Clackamas Print Concordia University – Concordia Chronicles Corban University – Hilltop News Eastern Oregon University – Eastern Voice George Fox University – The Crescent Lane Community College – The Torch Lewis & Clark College – The Pioneer Log Linfield College – The Linfield Review Linn-Benton Community College – The Commuter Mt. Hood Community College – The Advocate Oregon Institute of Technology – The Edge Oregon State University – The Daily Barometer Pacific University – The Pacific Index Portland State University – The Daily Vanguard Reed College – The Quest Southern Oregon University – The Siskiyou University of Oregon – Daily Emerald University of Portland – The Beacon
 Western Oregon University – The Western Oregon Journal Willamette University – The CollegianPennsylvania
 Allegheny College – The Campus Arcadia University – The Tower Bloomsburg University of Pennsylvania – The Voice Bryn Mawr College – The College News Bryn Mawr College and Haverford College – The Bi-College News Bucknell University – The Bucknellian Cabrini University – Loquitur Media California University of Pennsylvania – Cal Times Carnegie Mellon University – The Tartan Chestnut Hill College – The Griffin Community College of Philadelphia – The Student Vanguard Dickinson College – The Dickinsonian Drexel University – The Triangle Duquesne University – The Duquesne Duke Edinboro University of Pennsylvania – The Spectator Elizabethtown College – The Etownian Franklin and Marshall College – The College Reporter Gannon University – The Gannon Knight Gettysburg College – The Gettysburgian, The Gburg Forum Haverford College and Bryn Mawr College  – The Bi-College News Indiana University of Pennsylvania – The Penn Juniata College – The Juniatian Kutztown University of Pennsylvania – The Keystone La Salle University – The Collegian Lafayette College – The Lafayette Lehigh University – The Brown and White Mercyhurst College – The Merciad Millersville University of Pennsylvania – The Snapper Moravian University – The Comenian Muhlenberg College – The Muhlenberg Weekly Pennsylvania State University (Altoona Campus) – The Altoona Collegiate Review Pennsylvania State University (Beaver Campus) – The Roar Pennsylvania State University (Brandywine Campus) – The Lion's Eye Pennsylvania State University (Erie Campus) – The Behrend Beacon Pennsylvania State University (University Park Campus) – The Daily Collegian Point Park University- The Globe Saint Joseph's University – The Hawk and The Hawkeye Slippery Rock University – The Rocket Susquehanna University – The Quill Swarthmore College – The Phoenix, The Daily Gazette, Voices Temple University – Temple Times, The Temple News University of Pennsylvania – The Daily Pennsylvanian University of Pittsburgh – The Pitt News University of Pittsburgh at Johnstown - The Advocate University of Scranton – The Aquinas Villanova University – The Villanovan Washington & Jefferson College – Red & Black West Chester University of Pennsylvania - "The Quad"
 Westminster College – The HolcadRhode Island
 Brown University – The Brown Daily Herald Bryant University – The Archway Community College of Rhode Island – The Unfiltered Lens Johnson and Wales University – The Campus Herald Providence College – The Cowl Rhode Island College – The Anchor Roger Williams University – The Hawks' Herald University of Rhode Island –- The Good 5 Cent CigarSouth Carolina
 The Citadel, The Military College of South Carolina – The Brigadier Clemson University – The Tiger Coastal Carolina University – The Chanticleer College of Charleston – The Yard - CisternYard News, CisternYard Media South Carolina State University – The Collegian University of South Carolina – The Daily Gamecock University of South Carolina Aiken – Pacer Times University of South Carolina Spartanburg – The Carolinian Winthrop University – The JohnsonianSouth Dakota
 Augustana College – The Augustana Mirror Dakota State University – Trojan Times The South Dakota School of Mines and Technology – The Aurum South Dakota State University – The Collegian University of South Dakota – VolanteTennessee
 Austin Peay State University – The All State Covenant College – The Bagpipe East Tennessee State University – East Tennessean Fisk University – Fisk Forum Lee University – The Lee Clarion Tennessee State University – The Meter Tennessee Technological University – The Oracle Union University – Cardinal & Cream University of Memphis – The Daily Helmsman University of the South – The Sewanee Purple University of Tennessee – The Daily Beacon University of Tennessee at Martin – The Pacer University of Tennessee, Chattanooga – The University Echo Vanderbilt University – The Vanderbilt Hustler, Vanderbilt OrbisTexas
 Abilene Christian University – The Optimist Amarillo College – The Ranger Angelo State University – Ram Page Austin College – The Observer Baylor University – The Baylor Lariat and The Rope (satirical)
 Brazosport College – The Navigator Del Mar College – Del Mar Foghorn Eastfield College – The Et Cetera Houston Baptist University – The Daily Collegian Kilgore College – The Flare Lamar University – The University Press Midwestern State University – The Wichitan Lone Star College (formerly North Harris College) – North Star News Northeast Texas Community College – The Eagle Prairie View A&M University – The Panther Rice University – The Rice Thresher
 Richland College – The Chronicle Sam Houston State University – The Houstonian San Antonio College – The Ranger South Plains College – The Plainsman Press Southern Methodist University – The Daily Campus Southwestern University – The Megaphone Stephen F. Austin State University – The Pine Log St. Mary's University -- The Rattler Sul Ross State University – The Skyline Tarleton State University – J-Tac Tarleton State University – Texan News Service Tarrant County College – The Collegian Texas A&M University – The Battalion Texas A&M University-Commerce – The East Texan Texas Christian University – TCU Daily Skiff Texas Southern University – The TSU Herald Texas State University – The University Star Texas Tech University – The Daily Toreador Texas Woman's University – The Lasso Trinity University – The Trinitonian Tyler Junior College – The DrumBeat University of Houston – The Daily Cougar University of Houston–Clear Lake – The Signal University of Houston–Downtown – The Dateline Downtown University of Houston–Victoria – The Flame University of Mary Hardin-Baylor – The Bells University of North Texas – North Texas Daily University of St. Thomas – The Summa University of Texas at Arlington – The Shorthorn University of Texas at Austin – The Daily Texan and The Texas Travesty University of Texas at Brownsville – The Collegian (University of Texas at Brownsville) University of Texas at Dallas – The Mercury University of Texas at El Paso – The Prospector University of Texas at Rio Grande Valley - The Rider University of Texas at San Antonio – The Paisano University of Texas at Tyler – The Patriot Talon University of Texas-Pan American – The Pan-American West Texas A&M University – The PrairieUtah
 Brigham Young University – The Universe Southern Utah University — University Journal University of Utah – Daily Utah Chronicle Utah State University – Utah Statesman Utah Valley University – UVU Review Weber State University – The SignpostVermont
 Bennington College – The Bennington Free Press,  Before the End of the World Johnson State College – Basement Medicine Lyndon State College – The Critic Middlebury College – The Campus Norwich University – The Guidon Saint Michael's College – The Defender University of Vermont – The Vermont CynicVirginia
 Averett University – The Chanticleer Christopher Newport University – The Captain's Log College of William and Mary – The Flat Hat Eastern Mennonite University – The Weather Vane Ferrum College – Iron Blade George Mason University – Fourth Estate George Mason University School of Law – The Docket Hollins University – Hollins Columns James Madison University – The Breeze Liberty University – The Liberty Champion Longwood University – The Rotunda Lynchburg College – The Critograph Marymount University – The Banner Old Dominion University – The Mace & Crown Radford University – The Tartan Randolph College – The Sundial Randolph-Macon College – The Yellow Jacket University of Mary Washington – The Bullet University of Richmond – The Collegian University of Virginia – The Cavalier Daily,  The Declaration University of Virginia's College at Wise – The Highland Cavalier Virginia Commonwealth University – The Commonwealth Times Virginia Military Institute – The Cadet Virginia Tech – Collegiate Times Washington and Lee University – The Ring-Tum PhiWashington
 Bellevue College – The Jibsheet Central Washington University – The Observer Clark College – The Independent Eastern Washington University – The Easterner Edmonds College – The Triton Review Evergreen State College – Cooper Point Journal Everett Community College – The Clipper Gonzaga University – The Bulletin Green River Community College – The Current Pacific Lutheran University – The Mooring Mast Pierce College, Puyallup – The Puyallup Post Pierce College, Fort Steilacoom – Pierce Pioneer Seattle Central Community College – The Seattle Collegian Seattle Pacific University – The Falcon Seattle University – The Spectator Shoreline Community College – The Ebbtide Spokane Falls Community College – The Communicator University of Puget Sound – The Puget Sound Trail University of Washington – The Daily of the University of Washington University of Washington Tacoma – The Ledger Walla Walla University – The Collegian Washington State University – The Daily Evergreen 
 Washington State University Vancouver – The VanCougar Western Washington University – Western Front Whitman College – The Pioneer Whitworth University – The WhitworthianWest Virginia
 Alderson-Broaddus College – The Battler Columns Bethany College – The Tower Concord University – The Concordian Davis and Elkins College – The Senator Fairmont State University – The Columns Glenville State College – The Phoenix Marshall University – The Parthenon Ohio Valley University – The Highlander Salem International University – The Green & White Shepherd University – The Picket University of Charleston – The Eagle West Liberty University – The Trumpet West Virginia State University – The Yellow Jacket West Virginia University – The Daily Athenaeum,  The Mountaineer Jeffersonian West Virginia University at Parkersburg – The Chronicle West Virginia Wesleyan College – The Pharos Wheeling Jesuit University – The Cardinal ConnectionWisconsin
 Alverno College –  Alverno Alpha Beloit College – The Round Table Carroll University –  The New Perspective Lawrence University – The Lawrentian Madison Area Technical College – The Clarion Marquette University – Marquette Tribune, The Warrior Milwaukee Institute of Art & Design – The Streaming Rat Milwaukee School of Engineering – Ingenium St. Norbert College – St. Norbert Times University of Wisconsin–Eau Claire – The Spectator University of Wisconsin–Green Bay – The Fourth Estate University of Wisconsin–La Crosse – The Racquet University of Wisconsin–Madison –  The Daily Cardinal, The Badger Herald, The Madison Misnomer, and The Mendota Beacon (defunct)
 University of Wisconsin-Milwaukee – The UWM Post, The Leader, and Frontpage Milwaukee University of Wisconsin-Oshkosh – Advance-Titan University of Wisconsin-Parkside – The Ranger News University of Wisconsin-Platteville – The Exponent University of Wisconsin-River Falls – Student Voice University of Wisconsin-Stevens Point – The Pointer University of Wisconsin-Stout – The Stoutonia University of Wisconsin-Superior – The Stinger University of Wisconsin-Whitewater – The Royal PurpleWyoming
 Laramie County Community College – Wingspan Northwest College – Northwest Trail University of Wyoming – The Branding Iron''

See also
 List of student newspapers
 List of student newspapers in Canada
 List of student newspapers in the United Kingdom
 National Pacemaker Awards

References

External links
 CollegeTimes.com List of college newspapers
 Texas Digital Newspaper Program

Student